Frank S. Lombardo III (born July 12, 1958) is an American politician and a Democratic member of the Rhode Island Senate representing District 25 since January 2011.

Education
Lombardo attended Rhode Island College.

Elections
2012 Lombardo was challenged in the September 11, 2012 Democratic Primary, winning with 1,833 votes (63.4%), and was unopposed for the November 6, 2012 General election, winning with 9,551 votes.
2010 When District 25 Democratic Senator Christopher Maselli left the Legislature and left the seat open, Lombardo ran in the eight-way September 23, 2010 Democratic Primary, winning with 1,046 votes (18%) and won the six-way November 2, 2010 General election with 4,753 votes (43.8%) against Republican nominee Richard Fascia and Independent candidates Eric O'Connor, Alan Ross, Raffaele Florio, and Nikhol Bentley.

References

External links
Official page at the Rhode Island General Assembly

Frank Lombardo III at Ballotpedia
Frank Lombardo III at OpenSecrets

Place of birth missing (living people)
1958 births
Living people
People from Johnston, Rhode Island
Rhode Island College alumni
Democratic Party Rhode Island state senators
21st-century American politicians